Lunnarp is a locality situated in Tomelilla Municipality, Skåne County, Sweden with 339 inhabitants in 2010.

It is the site of the (fictional) murder in the mystery novel Faceless Killers.

References 

Populated places in Tomelilla Municipality
Populated places in Skåne County